Champ Island (Russian: Остров Чамп; Ostrov Champ) The highest point of the island is 507 meters above sea level.  The area is 374 km².  It is the southernmost island of the Zichy group of islands.  Administratively located in the Primorsky district of Franz Josef Land, Russia.

History
This island was named after William S. Champ, who was the representative of the late William Ziegler and leader of the relief operation searching for Anthony Fiala of the Fiala-Ziegler Polar Expedition.

A piece of a century-year-old ski was found in Champ Island, at Cape Trieste (Mys Triest) in August 2006.

Geography
There is a wide unglacierized zone in the southwest of the island.

Champ Island is the southernmost island of the Zichy Land subgroup of the Franz Joseph Archipelago. It is separated by narrow sounds from Luigi Island in the north and Salisbury Island in the northeast.

The broad channel in the west of Champ Island is known as Markham Sound (Пролив маркама; Proliv Markama), after British polar explorer Admiral Sir Albert Hastings Markham.

The island is known by its concretions, stone spheres with dimensions from millimetres to several meters.

See also 
 List of islands of Russia

References

External links

 High Arctic mosses & plants on Champ Island High Arctic mosses & plants on Champ Island
  Names in Russian

Islands of Franz Josef Land
Uninhabited islands of Russia